Allocolaspis is a genus of leaf beetles in the subfamily Eumolpinae.

Species

 Allocolaspis apatura Bechyné, 1957
 Allocolaspis atrisuturalis (Blake, 1976)
 Allocolaspis belti (Jacoby, 1881)
 Allocolaspis brunnea (Jacoby, 1900)
 Allocolaspis cacaoi (Blake, 1973)
 Allocolaspis cinctella (Lefèvre, 1884)
 Allocolaspis confusa (Bowditch, 1921)
 Allocolaspis costaricensis Bechyné, 1953
 Allocolaspis fastidiosa (Lefèvre, 1885)
 Allocolaspis fulva (Blake, 1976)
 Allocolaspis grandicollis (Blake, 1976)
 Allocolaspis halli Bechyné, 1950
 Allocolaspis halli costulata Bechyné, 1997
 Allocolaspis halli halli Bechyné, 1950
 Allocolaspis halli inordinata Bechyné, 1997
 Allocolaspis homoia (Blake, 1976)
 Allocolaspis insidiosa (Lefèvre, 1877)
 Allocolaspis jacobyi (Bowditch, 1921)
 Allocolaspis leiosomata (Blake, 1973)
 Allocolaspis lenta (Erichson, 1848)
 Allocolaspis mariana Bechyné, 1997
 Allocolaspis medvedevi Bechyné, 1958
 Allocolaspis ostmarki (Blake, 1973)
 Allocolaspis perplexa (Jacoby, 1900)
 Allocolaspis perterita Bechyné, 1958
 Allocolaspis sericea (Jacoby, 1900)
 Allocolaspis spadix (Blake, 1976)
 Allocolaspis sphaerophthalma Bechyné, 1953
 Allocolaspis straeleni Bechyné, 1950
 Allocolaspis subaenea (Jacoby, 1890)
 Allocolaspis subcostata (Jacoby, 1881)
 Allocolaspis submetallica (Jacoby, 1881)
 Allocolaspis taylori Bechyné, 1950
 Allocolaspis taylori llanera Bechyné, 1997
 Allocolaspis taylori taylori Bechyné, 1950
 Allocolaspis urucuana Bechyné, 1957

Synonyms:
 Allocolaspis gregalis (Weise, 1921): moved to Corysthea
 Allocolaspis rufa (Weise, 1921): moved to Corysthea

References

Eumolpinae
Chrysomelidae genera
Beetles of Central America
Beetles of South America